Metasia corsicalis is a species of moth in the family Crambidae. It is found in France, Spain, Italy, Croatia and on Corsica, Sardinia, Sicily and Malta.

References

Moths described in 1833
Metasia
Moths of Europe